Herbert Walton (21 May 1868, Scarborough – 28 February 1930) was an English first-class cricketer who played one match for Yorkshire County Cricket Club in 1893.

Despite taking five wickets against Liverpool and District with his right-arm fast-medium pace at an average of 27, this proved to be his only first-class appearance.  He scored 5 in his only innings.  He also made non-first-class appearances for Yorkshire Seconds and Yorkshire Colts against Durham, and in two matches for Scarborough against The Netherlands on their tour of 1892.

References 
Cricinfo Profile
Cricket Archive Statistics

Yorkshire cricketers
Cricketers from Scarborough, North Yorkshire
1930 deaths
English cricketers
1868 births
English cricketers of 1890 to 1918